Nitix (properly pronounced /nitiks/) was a retail Linux distribution, produced in Canada. The software is developed by Net Integration Technologies, Inc., which has been acquired by IBM as of January 2008 and currently operates as IBM Lotus Foundations.

History
Nitix, originally named Weaver was first created in September 1997 as a Linux-based server that required minimal configuration.  Primarily built into pre-configured hardware platforms named Net Integrators, Nitix first became a standalone operating system capable of deployment on third-party hardware in January 2004. Programming of the earliest versions of Weaver were done primarily by Avery Pennarun and Dave Coombs, while students of the University of Waterloo.

Nitix has claimed that it is the only Linux-based OS that has autonomic features. In June 2004, IBM Press' released a new book "Autonomic Computing," which mentions Nitix:

"Nitix is one of the first companies to deliver on the promise of autonomic technology with a complete set of intelligent networking solutions for the SMB Market."

In June 2005, Nitix Virtual Server was released, which allowed for the hosting of applications on its system. The architecture for the application services on Nitix allowed for applications to run in a virtual server environment, completely separated from the controlled OS environment. The Virtual Server is an RPM based filesystem which incorporates Yellow dog Updater, Modified as an application retrieval tool. Simultaneously Net Integration Technologies began sponsoring a "Ready For Nitix" program that encouraged independent software vendors to certify applications under Nitix. Also in June 2005, Nitix began to support NS3 (Scalable Services Structure), which allows for the centralized user management across multiple servers, as well as DNS propagation.

In March 2007, NitixBlue was released as a new "flavor" of Nitix. NitixBlue supports the nearly hands-free installation of IBM Lotus Domino, touting no administrative headaches and complete automation of maintenance tasks. This is considered to be a large step for small and medium businesses, which previously did not have a realistic stepping stone towards enterprise-level functionality provided by IBM Lotus Domino.

In January 2008, IBM announced to acquire Net Integration Technologies and now functions as a separate entity under the Lotus Software Group.

Features
Nitix includes an automated installation process in which it installs itself onto the hard disks, performs the proper partitioning and system setup.  During this process it also performs a network scan, where it determines whether or not it should enable its DHCP server, finds its gateway and internet access, and automatically configures its firewall.  For modifications to the installation process, a keyboard and monitor can be attached to the server and changes can be made on the console.  Further modifications can be made through the web interface.

The web interface is designed such that no other access is needed for configuration modifications in most cases.  From this interface, you can set up users, teams, and file access; email, collaboration through ExchangeIt!, antivirus and antispam; web sites, FTP and rsync services, NFS, Samba, AppleTalk; and more.

Nitix offers multi-layer security protection based on anti-virus technology from Kaspersky and anti-spam technology from Vircom and Engate.

Nitix's claim to fame is its proprietary Intelligent Disk Backup (idb) that automatically backs up files, emails and databases incrementally as often as every 15 minutes. Backups are made to a hard drive located in the system that can be rotated to provide off-site redundancy. Restoring files can be done individually, by user or by entire system through its web-based interface. ( U.S. Patent No. 7,165,154 )

Nitix includes many open source applications that provide a lot of its functionality.

IBM Lotus Foundations Start
On January 18, 2008, IBM announced its intention to purchase Net Integrations Technologies. IBM has merged both products into an offering known as IBM Lotus Foundations. Lotus Foundations is offered as a Software-only application server platform as well as a hardware appliance known as Net Integrator.  As of July 2, 2008, IBM has officially started offering Lotus Foundations as opposed to Nitix Blue .

IBM Lotus Foundations products were withdrawn from marketing on March 14, 2013 and are no longer available for purchase.
Support for IBM Lotus Foundations products will be withdrawn on September 30, 2014.

Versions
Nitix has been discontinued in favour of IBM Lotus Foundations Start. Nitix is currently sold through a distribution channel as either software-only, or on a Net Integrator.  Software-only versions are "Nitix SB", "Nitix SE", and "Nitix PE", which come on 1 CD, and are geared towards partners that complement their own third party hardware systems with Nitix.  The differences between these are the number of Client Access Licenses included, and software assurance prices.  Nitix can also be pre-configured on hardware systems named "Micro", "Micro 2", "Mark I" and "Mark II".  Hardware selection depends on number of hard drives and form factor.

Distribution
Nitix has been discontinued for sale through all distribution channels in favor of the latest Lotus Foundations Start .  Support will be active.
Value added resellers can purchase Lotus Foundations and resell it to end users as part of their complete solution, usually involving other IT services or custom made applications.

References
 https://web.archive.org/web/20130923200526/http://www.lotusfoundations.com/ Lotus Foundations public website
 https://web.archive.org/web/20080307040932/http://www.open.nit.ca/wiki/ Nitix Wild open source website
 https://web.archive.org/web/20080423201757/http://www.crn.com/software/190600048 CRN's Article: Nitix: An Ideal Small-Business Server

External links
 https://web.archive.org/web/20080311102155/http://www.nitix.com/ Nitix NitixBlue OS public website

Discontinued Linux distributions
Linux distributions